Cheung Kang is a village in Wu Kai Sha, Ma On Shan, Sha Tin District, Hong Kong.

Administration
Wu Kai Sha (including Cheung Kang)  is a recognized village under the New Territories Small House Policy.

Features
A 15 meter high cinnamomum camphora tree in Cheung Kang is listed on the Development Bureau's Register of Old and Valuable Trees.

References

External links

 Delineation of area of existing village Wu Kai Sha and Cheung Kang (Sha Tin) for election of resident representative (2019 to 2022)

Villages in Sha Tin District, Hong Kong
Wu Kai Sha